Norman Josiffe (born 12 February 1940), better known in the media as Norman Scott, is an English former dressage trainer and model who was a key figure in the Thorpe affair, a major British political scandal of the 1970s. The scandal revolved around the alleged plot by his ex-boyfriend, Liberal Party leader Jeremy Thorpe, to murder Scott after Scott threatened to reveal their relationship to the media.

Early life, 1940-1960
Josiffe was born in Sidcup, Kent, to Ena Dorothy Josiffe (née Lynch, formerly Merritt, 1907–1985), and Albert Norman Josiffe (1908–1983), her second husband, who abandoned his wife and child soon after Norman's birth. Educated at Bexleyheath, he later changed his surname to "Lianche-Josiffe" by amending his mother's maiden name, Lynch, and for a time called himself "the Hon Norman Lianche-Josiffe".

Relationship with Jeremy Thorpe, murder attempt and trial, 1961-1979
In 1961, Josiffe worked as a groom for Brecht Van de Vater (born Norman Vivian Vater), at Kingham Stables in Chipping Norton, Oxfordshire, when he met Jeremy Thorpe, MP, a friend of Vater. After Josiffe left his job at Vater's stables, he suffered from mental illness and spent some time in a psychiatric hospital. On 8 November 1961, a week after discharging himself from the Ashurst clinic in Oxford, he went to the House of Commons in London to see Thorpe. He was penniless, homeless and, worse, had left Vater's employment without his National Insurance card which, at that time, was essential for obtaining regular work and access to social and unemployment benefits. Thorpe promised he would help. This was when the relationship between the two men was alleged to have started. Thorpe gave him the nickname "Bunnies" but always denied any physical element in the relationship. When Jeremy Thorpe, MP, took him to stay with his mother, Ursula Thorpe, he introduced himself as "Peter Johnson". Josiffe's claims of mistreatment by Thorpe, led to his being reported to the police, in the course of which the relationship was revealed.

The relationship allegedly led indirectly to the 1975 attempted murder of Josiffe, who was by then calling himself Norman Scott. His attacker, Andrew Newton, was arrested after shooting dead Josiffe's dog, Rinka, but it was not until later that Josiffe's accusations against Thorpe became public. 

In 1979, Scott testified at Thorpe's trial, Thorpe and three others were acquitted of conspiracy to murder. While the Sexual Offences Act 1967 had decriminalised homosexual acts in most of the UK,  the resulting scandal lost Thorpe his popular support and he was forced to stand down as leader of the Liberal Party.

Personal life
On 13 May 1969, after his relationship with Thorpe, Josiffe (now calling himself Scott) married Angela Mary Susan Myers (1945–1986), sister-in-law of the English comedy actor Terry-Thomas.  Susan Scott was already 2 months pregnant at the time of their marriage and her family were not supportive of the marriage - her mother and sister refused to attend the ceremony and Captain Myers (his father-in-law) denounced Scott as homosexual at the wedding reception stating that the marriage "was doomed". The couple had a son - Diggory Benjamin W. Scott, who was born later in 1969 in Spilsby, Lincolnshire.  Susan Scott left Scott in 1970, subsequently divorced, remarried in 1975 and died in 1986.

In 1971 while living in Tal-y-Bont in North Wales, where he found casual work, Scott met widow Gwen Parry-Jones, whose late husband had been a soldier in the Welsh Guards. She was a former local village postmistress and was an acquaintance of Liberal MP Emlyn Hooson. Parry-Jones arranged a meeting with Hooson, who interviewed Scott (with Liberal MP David Steel) about his relationship with Thorpe and started his own investigations, but could not substantiate the allegations. After the break-up with Scott, Parry-Jones became very depressed. In 1972, her aunt failed to get any response at her home for several weeks and the police discovered that she had died, which the coroner subsequently recorded as alcohol poisoning.

After 1979 retreated into obscurity. At the time of Thorpe's death in 2014, he was living in Ireland, but by the time of the 2018 dramatisation he had returned to the UK to live in Devon.

In popular culture
In 2016 John Preston published a book about the scandal;

In 2018, the BBC miniseries A Very English Scandal were aired and Scott was portrayed by Ben Whishaw.  Scott remarked to The Irish News: "I'm portrayed as this poor, mincing, little gay person ... I also come across as a weakling and I've never been a weakling." 

The mini-series' director, Stephen Frears, has described Scott as "erratic", stating that his reactions to both book and television series are inconsistent.
Thorpe's biographer Michael Bloch described Josiffe as both a liar and a fantasist.

References

Citations

Sources

1940 births
People from Sidcup
English male models
LGBT men
English LGBT people
Political sex scandals in the United Kingdom
Living people